WBPT (106.9 FM, "Classic Rock 106.9") is a classic rock music-formatted radio station licensed to Homewood, Alabama, that serves the Birmingham and central Alabama area.  The station was assigned the WBPT call letters by the Federal Communications Commission on October 17, 2001. Since October 2005, it has used the branding "106.9 the Eagle". The station is owned by SummitMedia, along with six other stations in the cluster, and all share studios in the Cahaba neighborhood in far southeast Birmingham. Its transmitter is located atop Red Mountain in Birmingham.

History
The 106.9 frequency has been the home of several formats and call signs throughout its history. It signed on as WBRC-FM in 1957, the second attempt at an FM station from WBRC (one had operated from 1948 to December 3, 1949, at 102.5 MHz, broadcasting with 546,000 watts). Throughout the 1960s, the FM station simulcasted WBRC AM, a typical practice for its day.  By 1971, WBRC-FM was playing Top 40 music, but it was not successful in competing against the AM Top 40 powerhouses WSGN or WVOK.  In 1972, both the AM and FM radio stations were sold by Taft Broadcasting to Mooney Broadcasting; as a result, the call signs of the radio stations were changed to WERC AM and -FM, respectively.  The AM station dropped "middle of the road" music (a precursor to today's adult contemporary format) in favor of Top 40.  The FM station repeated the AM station's daytime programming, while at night it featured separate album-oriented rock shows.

In 1977, the broadcast facilities of WERC-FM were upgraded, and in July of that year the callsign was changed to WKXX.  After several weeks of stunting, WKXX became the only Top 40 station on the FM dial in Birmingham, with the branding "Kicks 106" on August 5, 1977.  By the next year, "Kicks 106" had become the top-rated radio station in Birmingham, dethroning the longstanding ratings leader, WSGN "the Big 610" (now WAGG).  The success of "Kicks 106" eventually forced both WSGN and WKXX's own AM sister station, branded "96-ERC", to abandon their Top 40 formats.

Throughout the late 1970s and early 1980s, WKXX was the dominant FM Top 40 station in Birmingham.  As late as 1984, "Kicks 106" held the top spot in ratings among Birmingham stations.  This success continued until 1985, when WAPI-FM (branded "I-95") became the second station in the market to employ the format and surpassed WKXX in the local ratings.  In addition, Top 40 stations from Tuscaloosa and Gadsden could be picked up in most of the Birmingham area.  By between 1987 and 1988, "Kicks 106" modified its format, playing a hybrid of Top 40 and urban crossover music, positioning itself somewhat between I-95 and urban station WENN.  Initially, the altered format was successful.  However, in 1989, the station returned to a straight Top 40 format, with a new branding, "X-106".  The new format and nickname were not well-received, however, and in 1990, the station reverted to branding itself as "Kicks 106", and returned to the Top 40/urban hybrid.

In June 1991, WKXX finally abandoned its Top 40 format and became "Real Country 106.9", WBMH. Some six months later, the callsign was changed to WIKX and the "Kicks 106" name reappeared (in fact, many of the old Top 40-era "Kicks" jingles were used), but the station retained its country format.  The station was less successful playing country music than they had been in their last days as a Top 40 station.

In October 1992, 106.9 took on its next callsign and format, becoming WODL, "Oldies 106.9".  The station continued in this format until October 2001, when the oldies format moved from 106.9 to 97.3, which was co-owned by Cox Radio.  After the move, WBPT debuted on 106.9, calling itself "106-9 the Point", playing an all-1980s music format. "The Point" was usually ranked low in the Birmingham Arbitron ratings. In October 2005, the station added a broader rotation of rock classic hits and adopted new branding as "106-9 the Eagle". The station played hits of the 1970s through the 1990s from artists generally associated with classic rock radio stations. In mid-2014, the station changed formats once again to all classic rock, as evidenced by its new slogan ("The Only Classic Rock Station") and augmented library of songs, generally sticking to the same "rock hits of the 1970s-1990s" repertoire interspersed with a slightly expanded playlist.

On July 20, 2012, Cox Radio, Inc. announced the sale of WBPT and 22 other stations to SummitMedia LLC for $66.25 million. The sale was consummated on May 3, 2013.

The callsign WKXX is now used in Gadsden for a Fox Sports Radio station at 102.9 FM.

On December 20, 2022, WBPT rebranded as "Classic Rock 106.9".

Previous logo

References

External links
Classic Rock 106.9 WBPT official website

BPT
Classic rock radio stations in the United States
Radio stations established in 1957
1957 establishments in Alabama
Taft Broadcasting